Nothing Exceeds Like Excess is the seventh full-length album by the band Raven, released in 1988. It is Raven's first album with drummer, Joe Hasselvander who replaced original drummer/founding member Rob Hunter.

Track listing

Personnel

Raven
John Gallagher - basses, lead vocals, engineer
Mark Gallagher - guitar, backing vocals, engineer
Joe Hasselvander - drums, backing vocals

Production
Bob Yeager - engineer
Bob Ludwig - mastering at Masterdisk, New York

References

1988 albums
Raven (British band) albums
Combat Records albums